Midori Station is the name of two train stations in Japan:

 Midori Station (Gifu) (水鳥駅)
 Midori Station (Hokkaidō) (緑駅)